The finals and the qualifying heats of the women's 400 metre freestyle event at the 1998 World Aquatics Championships were held on Wednesday 14 January 1998 in Perth, Western Australia.

A Final

B Final

Qualifying heats

See also
1996 Women's Olympic Games 400m Freestyle (Atlanta)
1997 Women's World SC Championships 400m Freestyle (Gothenburg)
1997 Women's European LC Championships 400m Freestyle (Seville)
2000 Women's Olympic Games 400m Freestyle (Sydney)

References

Swimming at the 1998 World Aquatics Championships
1998 in women's swimming